Dan Bayles (born 1977) is an artist based in Los Angeles.

Bayles makes semi-abstract paintings based on landscape.

He received his MFA from the University of California, Irvine, in 2007.

Selected exhibitions
2002 The Help, The Smell, Los Angeles
2005 From the Back Pages, Allston Skirt Gallery, Boston
2006 Incognito, Santa Monica Museum of Art, Santa Monica
2006 Agent Once, Acuna-Hansen Gallery, Los Angeles
2006 Drawing Show, Catalyst Art Gallery, Irvine
2007 Cali In Copenhagen II-Bucket of Ice, Co-Lab Copenhagen, Copenhagen
2007 ZOO fair, Royal Academy of Arts, London
2007 Chung King Project, Los Angeles
2008 Abstraction, Michael Kohn Gallery, Los Angeles
2008 Zero, Aanant & Zoo, Berlin
2009 Abstract America: New Paintings from the U.S., Saatchi Gallery, London
2009 Dan Bayles: New Paintings, Ghebaly Gallery, Los Angeles
2010 90012: Daniel Bayles, Gina Osterloh, and Patrick Jackson, Kate Werble Gallery, New York
2010 Contract-W914NS-04-D-009, Ghebaly Gallery, Los Angeles
2012 Los Angeles Contemporary Tendencies, Helene Bailly Gallery, Paris
2015 The Apotheosis of Washington, Ghebaly Gallery, Los Angeles

References

External links
Dan Bayles on ArtFacts.net
Dan Bayles on AanantZoo.com
Further information from the Saatchi Gallery
LAtimes article

University of California, Irvine alumni
Living people
1977 births
Artists from Los Angeles